The women's 3 metre springboard, also reported as springboard diving, was one of four diving events on the Diving at the 1980 Summer Olympics programme.

The competition was split into two phases:

Preliminary round (20 July)
Divers performed ten dives. The eight divers with the highest scores advanced to the final.
Final (21 July)
Divers performed another set of ten dives and the score here obtained was combined with half of the preliminary score to determine the final ranking.

Results

References

Sources
 

Women
1980
1980 in women's diving
Women's events at the 1980 Summer Olympics